Silent Shout: An Audio Visual Experience is a concert film and live album by Swedish band The Knife, taken from the 12 April 2006 concert at the Trädgår'n, Gothenburg, Sweden, in their 2006 Silent Shout tour. It was released in Sweden in November 2006 on The Knife's Rabid Records label.

The DVD features a 5.1 surround sound recording of the show (with visuals from Andreas Nilsson), as well as all 11 of their music videos. Their short film When I Found The Knife is also included.

The DVD was included in a limited edition box set version of Silent Shout released in July 2007 along with an additional CD of the concert's audio.

Track listings

Album / Set list
 "Pass This On" – 5:42
 "The Captain" – 6:12
 "We Share Our Mothers' Health" – 4:22
 "You Make Me Like Charity" – 4:23
 "Marble House" – 4:58
 "Forest Families" – 4:17
 "Kino" – 5:06
 "Heartbeats" – 4:24
 "Silent Shout" – 5:19
 "From Off to On" – 5:35

DVD
 Live show
 Music videos
 "N.Y. Hotel"
 "Heartbeats"
 "You Take My Breath Away" (version 1)
 "Pass This On"
 "Handy-Man"
 "You Take My Breath Away" (version 2)
 "Silent Shout"
 "Marble House" (original Björn Renner video)
 "We Share Our Mothers' Health"
 "Like a Pen"
 "Marble House" (previously unreleased Chris Hopewell version)
 Short film
 When I Found The Knife (2004)

External links
Discogs entry

2006 live albums
2006 video albums
Concert films
Live video albums
The Knife albums
2000s English-language films